The Australian Services cricket team in England in 1945 played six first-class matches, winning three and losing two with one match drawn.

Annual reviews
 Wisden Cricketers' Almanack 1946

Further reading
 Bill Frindall, The Wisden Book of Test Cricket 1877-1978, Wisden, 1979
 Chris Harte, A History of Australian Cricket, Andre Deutsch, 1993

External links
 CricketArchive – tour summaries

1945 in Australian cricket
1945 in English cricket
Australian Services 1945
English cricket seasons in the 20th century
International cricket competitions from 1918–19 to 1945